Rubber   is a 1936 Dutch film directed by Johan De Meester and Gerard Rutten. It tells the story of Dutch newlyweds trying to adjust to a difficult life on a Sumatran plantation. A large portion of the film is believed to be lost; a 63-minute fragment remains in the archives of the Dutch Film Museum.

Cast
In alphabetical order
Johan De Meester	
Leo de Hartogh		
Philip Dorn	... 	John van Laer (as Frits van Dongen)
Matthieu van Eysden		
Ben Groenier		
Jan Hahn		
Constant van Kerckhoven Jr.		
Folkert Kramer		
Philippe La Chapelle		
Enny Meunier		
Amsy Moina		
Dolly Mollinger	... 	Anette
Johan Schilthuyzen		
Georges Spanelly	... 	Ravinsky
Hendrik Van Ees		
Daan Van Olleffen		(as Daan van Offelen jr.)
Tony Van Otterloo	... 	Joop
Elias van Praag		
Mien Duymaer Van Twist		
Jules Verstraete	... 	Meesters
A. Wilmink	... 	Popole

External links 
 

1936 films
1936 drama films
Dutch black-and-white films
Films directed by Gerard Rutten
Dutch drama films
1930s Dutch-language films